Horniman is an English surname. Notable people with this surname include the following:

 Annie Horniman (1860–1937), English theatre patron and manager; daughter of Frederick John Horniman
 B. G. Horniman (1873–1948), British journalist, editor of the Bombay Chronicle, supporter of Indian independence
 Emslie Horniman (1863–1932), British anthropologist, philanthropist and Liberal Party politician; son of Frederick John Horniman
 Frederick John Horniman (1835–1906), English tea trader, collector and public benefactor
 Joanne Horniman (born 1951), Australian author for children, teenagers and young adults
 Roy Horniman (1874–1930), British writer, journalist and theatre owner

English-language surnames